Nam-nguen Boonnak is a Thai actress.

Biography
She was born as Suang Jaruwijit (สวง จารุวิจิตร; nickname: Peak เปี๊ยก) on January 24, 1940 at Nakhon Nayok province, approximately less than 2 hrs from Bangkok. Her grandfather had the title of Phraya as a playwright who worked closely with King Rama VI. Her father served in the civil service and her mother was of Chinese descent.

She entered the showbiz in 1957 and has won the best supporting actress 1965 Saraswati Awards from Nang Sao Phoradok (นางสาวโพระดก), and won this award again in 1966 from Ka Wao (กาเหว่า).

She has starred alongside legendary performers were Mitr Chaibancha and Petchara Chaowarat.

Boonnak is well recognized by her role as Yai Sai (ยายสาย), a krasue in the 1994 TV series Krasue (กระสือ), and role as Clark's mother in Monrak luk thung (มนต์รักลูกทุ่ง) in 1995, the remake of 1970 movie in the same title.

In modern times Boonnak is well-acquainted with being a supporting character in many TV series, usually role as servant or grandma.

In the early 2017, she received the lifetime achievement award 31st TVG Awards.

Filmography

Television dramas
 2022 The Miracle of Teddy Bear (คุณหมีปาฏิหาริย์) (THANAD LAKORN/Ch.3) as Mathanee (มทนี คนึงนิจ (ยายมทนี)) (Cameo)
 2022 Bad Romeo (คือเธอ) (Thong Entertainment/Ch.3) as Namthong (น้ำทอง) (Cameo)

References

External links
 

1940 births
Living people
Nam-nguen Boonnak
Nam-nguen Boonnak
Nam-nguen Boonnak
Nam-nguen Boonnak
Nam-nguen Boonnak
Nam-nguen Boonnak
Nam-nguen Boonnak